Urales Vargas (born March 15, 1980), known professionally as DJ Buddha, is an American DJ, record producer, radio personality,  music publisher, and record executive from Lawrence, Massachusetts.

In 2015, Buddha was enshrined into the Lawrence Boys & Girls Clubs' Hall Of Fame.

Bridging the gap
Over the last few years, the urban music industry has seen an evolution bridging together forms of music from the streets from different cultures, including hip hop, R&B, Jamaican reggae and Latin music. Within this movement, DJ Buddha has also developed and evolved into becoming an integral player in the future expansion of these genres.
Buddha was associated with team, La Favela, in the form of a mixtape and a movement called "Caribbean Connection," which delivered a continuous mix of Dancehall reggae and reggaetón. Along with the "Caribbean Connection" and ‘Tropical Heat" series, he has created hundreds of mixtapes which were critically acclaimed in various articles from: Fader, Rolling Stone, NY Times, Boston Globe, Boston Herald, Miami Herald, Ozone Magazine, MTV.com, Billboard.com, etc. DJ Buddha has showcased his talent, performing in 6 out of 7 continents. He has also recently released a mix album titled "Ultra.Latino" which hit #2 on iTunes Latin within the 1st week of its release date. His creativity and gift of music, is what helps him continue to bring forth new, improved and different sounds.

Collaborations
DJ Buddha soon began building relationships with the artists whose music he had been promoting. He worked alongside reggae artist, Mighty Mystic in which he began creating records and collaborating with other reggae artists such as Mr. Easy, Tantro Metro & Devonte, Mr. Vegas, Red Rat, and T.O.K. It was when he met dancehall reggae group, T.O.K. that he became their official DJ for about 6 years. While on the road with T.O.K., Buddha created the remix for "Gal Yuh A Lead", featuring T.O.K., Beenie Man, & Nina Sky, which was one of his first songs to gain major airplay. He also created two different promotional mixtape samplers of T.O.K and Lady Saw for reggae indie label VP Records.

He has worked on remixes with other artists like Pitbull, Daddy Yankee, Machel Montano, Lil Jon, N.O.R.E., etc. In 2004 Daddy Yankee's "Gasolina" was remixed by DJ Buddha, featuring Cuban-American rapper, Pitbull and N.O.R.E., and first appeared on Caribbean Connection Volume 2. It was a smash hit. Later that summer, Lil Jon mixed his own vocals to the remix, which was featured on his Crunk Juice album. In 2005 he teamed up with Pitbull again on "She's Hotter Remix" featuring T.O.K. He later became Pitbull's official DJ and joined him on the road for the next 6 years.

Buddha has been a part of the 25th anniversary of Michael Jackson's Bad album, doing the 2012 edit of Bad with Afrojack & Pitbull. Also co-produced with Marc Kinchen & Big Syphe the theme song for the Men In Black 3 film, titled "Back In Time". Buddha recently (2014) won a grammy for his work on the song Echa Pa'lla (Manos Pa'rriba) - Pitbull featuring Papayo.

In 2016, Buddha was the music superviser to the Nick Cannon directed feature film, King of the Dancehall (film).

2017, Buddha released his first single with dancehall artist Munga, titled WAAR, which has over 15 million streams on Spotify.

Discography

Mixtape

Tropical Heat Vol. 1 – Vol. 25 (Dancehall, Reggae & Soca)
Caribbean Connection Vol. 1 – Vol. 7 (Dancehall Meets Reggaeton)
Pitbull : Free Agent
International Takeover: The United Nations
Mr. Worldwide

Tracks (produced, written or remixed)

Daddy Yankee Ft. Pitbull, N.O.R.E. & Lil Jon – Gasolina (Dj Buddha RMX)
Lil Jon Ft. Daddy Yankee & Pitbull – What U Gon' Do (Latino RMX)
Rupee Ft. Daddy Yankee – Tempted To Touch (RMX)
Pitbull Ft. Lil Jon, Mr. Vegas, Wayne Marshall, Red Rat, T.O.K & Kardinal Offishall – Toma (Dj Buddha RMX)
T.O.K Ft. Pitbull – She's Hotter
Pitbull Ft. Don Omar - Fuego (Dj Buddha RMX) (as appeared on Madden NFL 08)
Machel Montano & Pitbull - Defense
Paulina Rubio Ft. Pitbull - Ni Rosas Ni Juguetes (RMX)
Pitbull Ft. Machel Montano - Alright
Pitbull Vs. Afrojack - Maldito Alcohol
Pitbull Ft. Lil Jon, Sensato, Black Point & El Cata - Watagatapitusberry Remix
Pitbull Ft. Machel Montano - Bon, Bon (Dj Buddha Soca RMX)
Pitbull - Pause
Pitbull Ft. Vein, David Rush & RedFoo of LMFAO - Took My Love
Pitbull Ft. Enrique Iglesias & Afrojack - I Like - The Remix
Juan Magan Ft. Pitbull & El Cata - Bailando Por El Mundo (Grammy Nomination)
Sensato Ft. Pitbull & Sak Noel - Crazy People (Grammy Nomination)
Michel Telo & Pitbull - Ai Se Eu Te Pego (If I Get Ya) (Worldwide Remix)
Beatriz Luengo Ft. Shaggy - Lengua
Pitbull - Back in Time
Pitbull Ft. Shakira - Get It Started
Michael Jackson - Bad (Afrojack Remix) (Ft. Pitbull) [DJ Buddha Edit]
Paris Hilton - Good Time
Pitbull Ft. Papayo - Echa Pa'lla (Manos Pa'rriba) (Grammy Nomination)'(Grammy Winner)Pitbull Ft. Christina Aguilera - Feel This Moment
Pitbull Ft. Sensato - Global Warming (Intro)
Pitbull Ft. Usher & Afrojack - Party Ain't Over
Pitbull Ft. Jennifer Lopez - Drinks for You (Ladies Anthem)
Pitbull Ft. The Wanted & Afrojack - Have Some Fun
Pitbull Ft. Havana Brown & Afrojack - Last Night (Never Happen)
Pitbull Ft. Akon & David Rush - Everybody Fucks
Dyland & Lenny Ft. Pitbull & Beatriz Luengo - Sin Ti (Don't Want To Miss a Thing) 
Frankie J Ft. Pitbull - Beautiful
Will.I.Am Ft. Afrojack - Hello
Pee Wee - Oh Donna (Come Back To Me) 
Becky G Ft. Pitbull - Can't Get Enough 
Jason Derulo Ft. Pitbull - Fire
Nick Cannon - Looking For a Dream
Nick Cannon Ft. DJ Class & FatMan Scoop - F*** Your Birthday
Nick Cannon Ft. Polow Da Don & Amba Shepherd - OJ
Nick Cannon - F n Awesome
Veronica Vega Ft. Pitbull - Wicked
Afrojack Ft. Chris Brown - As Your Friend
Afrojack Ft. Tyler Glenn - Born To Run
Afrojack Ft. Snoop Dogg - Dynamite
Afrojack Ft. Wiz Khalifa and Kevin Cruise - Too Wild
Afrojack Ft. Sting - Catch Tomorrow
Afrojack Ft. Shirazi - Mexico
Afrojack Ft. Matthew Koma - Keep Our Love Alive
Afrojack - Faded
Angela Hunte and Machel Montano - Party Done
Kreesha Turner Ft. T.O.K - Sexy Gal
Mohombi- Turn It Up
3Ball MTY Ft. Becky G- Quiero Bailar
3Ball MTY Ft. Cowboy Troy- Vaquero Electro
Clinton Sparks feat. T.I.- UV Love
Samantha J Ft. Dej Loaf- League Of My Own
Anahí Ft. Zuzuka Poderosa- Boom Cha
Angela Hunte - Mon Bon Ami
Machel Montano - Human
Angela Hunte and Machel Montano - Like So
Veronica Vega Ft. Lil Wayne & Jeremih - Wave
Kirstin Maldonado - Bad Weather
Leikeli47 - Bubble Gum
Chris Brown Ft. Jhené Aiko & R. Kelly - Juicy Booty
Dj Buddha Ft. Munga - WAAR
Dj Buddha, Cutty Ranks & Shermanology Ft. Steve Andreas - Money House
Maffio, Angela Hunte & DJ Buddha - Ella Baila
Ananya Birla Ft. WurlD & Vector - Blackout
Ananya Birla - Disappear
Alcover, Jhoni The Voice & Joell - Bomba
Amara La Negra - Tare
Amara La Negra - Now That You're Gone
Amara La Negra Ft. Messiah - Celebra
Patoranking - Temperature
Ally Brooke x Matoma - Higher
Dj Nelson - Que Pasa Aqui
Afrojack Ft. Ally Brooke - All Night
Dj Buddha x Angela Hunte - Speaker
Cierra Ramirez Ft. Bulova - Charlie
Quincy - Aye Yo
Dj Delano & Dj Buddha Ft. Beenie Man - The Keys (Steve Andreas Mix)
Maffio Ft. Nicky Jam & Akon - Uchi WallaAlbums (appeared on or produced)Crunk Juice - Lil Jon & the East Side Boyz
Crunk Hits Vol. 2 - Various Artists
Money Is Still A Major Issue - Pitbull	
Unknown Language - T.O.K.
N.O.R.E. y la Familia...Ya Tú Sabe - N.O.R.E.
The Boatlift - Pitbull
Flame On - Machel Montano
Rebelution - Pitbull
34 - Machel Montano
Armando- Pitbull
Ultra.Latino - DJ Buddha
Planet Pit - Pitbull
Bad 25 - Michael Jackson
Global Warming - Pitbull
Vive2Life - Pee Wee
My World 2 - Dyland & Lenny
Faith, Hope, y Amor - Frankie J (Grammy Nomination)'
Plat It Again EP - Becky G
White People Party Music - Nick Cannon
Tattoos - Jason Derulo
Global - 3Ball MTY
Forget the World - Afrojack
Caribbean Beats Vol. 1 (Instrumental) - Various Artists

Publications

The New York Times (2004)
The Boston Globe (2004)
Boston Herald (2005)
Philadelphia Daily News (2004)
Miami Herald (2005)
The Village Voice (2004)
The Source Magazine (2004)
Fader Magazine (2004) & (2005)
Ozone Magazine (2004) & (2005)
Riddims Magazine (’04)
MTV.com/Mixtape Mondays (3 times)
LatinRapper.com (2004)
Billboard.com (2010)

References

External links 
 Myspace
 Twitter

American people of Dominican Republic descent
American DJs
American hip hop DJs
American hip hop record producers
Dancehall musicians
American reggaeton musicians
American reggae musicians
1980 births
Living people